Minhal Sohail (born 3 January 1995) is a Pakistani sport shooter. In 2016, she became the first female shooter to represent her country at the Olympics when she participated in the Rio Games. She competes in the 10 metre Air Rifle category.

Career
Hailing from Karachi, Sohail started her shooting career in 2012. Trained at PNS Karsaz shooting range in Karachi, in national tournaments she represents Pakistan Navy. She has secured notable positions and accolades in numerous tournaments across the globe.

Rio Olympics 
Sohail competed on a quota place in the women's 10 metre air rifle event at the 2016 Summer Olympics. Needing to secure a spot in top eight to progress, she secured 28th rank among 51 shooters and finished with 413.2 points. Sohail stated that she was very excited for her participation in the mega sporting event and wished to bring laurels to Pakistan. She considers it a huge honor as being the first Pakistani woman shooter to compete at the Olympics.

Media coverage 
Oscar-winning filmmaker Sharmeen Obaid-Chinoy has developed a short documentary about her titled ‘Dream Big Pakistan. The short-film shares her training sessions at the Pakistan Navy Shooting Range Facility, Karsaz and her vision of being a part of the Olympics. The film also features S/Lieutenant Coach Khalid Bin Anwar who coached Minhal for the Olympics.

References

External links
 

1995 births
Living people
Pakistani female sport shooters
Olympic shooters of Pakistan
Shooters at the 2016 Summer Olympics
Place of birth missing (living people)
Shooters at the 2014 Asian Games
Shooters at the 2018 Asian Games
Asian Games competitors for Pakistan
21st-century Pakistani women